Jean de Vienne was a French light cruiser of the . During World War II, she remained with Vichy France. She was named for Jean de Vienne, a 14th-century French knight, general and admiral during the Hundred Years' War.

Design and description
The La Galissonnière class was designed as an enlarged and improved version of the preceding . Their crew consisted of 557 men in peacetime and 612 in wartime.

When completed, Jean de Vienne, and  formed the 3rd Cruisers Division, flagship Marseillaise, attached to the Mediterranean Squadron, and based in Bizerte. At the start of World War II, Jean de Vienne had completed a major refit at Toulon and had returned to the 3rd Cruiser Division, still at Bizerte. Her formation was to protect French interests in North Africa, should Italy enter the war. As Italy remained neutral, the 3rd Cruiser Division's role was limited, the main event being to transport French gold bullion to Halifax, Nova Scotia in December 1939. After Italy's entry into the war on 10 June 1940, there was a major French sortie to prevent anticipated attempts by the Kriegsmarine to force the Straits of Gibraltar.

With the other La Galissonnière-class cruisers, Jean de Vienne was at Algiers at the time of the Armistice, in late June 1940. On 3 July, at Mers-el-Kébir, Admiral Sommerville,  commander of Force H, had to deliver an ultimatum to the French admiral commanding the French battleship squadron, either to join the British or to be attacked. As negotiations dragged on, the French Admiralty signaled in a radio message in clear, that the Algiers cruisers had been ordered to join the battleship squadron off Mers-el-Kébir. The British Admiralty warned Admiral Somerville and hurried him to put an end to the negotiations with the French admiral and to open fire. So the six cruisers, too far to intervene, made for Toulon instead, where they arrived the day after. Jean de Vienne remained there, out of action until she joined the French High Seas Force in March 1941. In January 1942, Jean de Vienne was sent to rescue the liner Lamoriciere, whose sinking in a winter tempest, off the Balearic Islands, caused more than 300 deaths.
.

During the scuttling of the French fleet in Toulon, Jean de Vienne was in drydock, and her captain, Capitaine de Vaisseau Mailloux had her moved forward, to obstruct the gates. Although German commandos rushed aboard and found and disarmed the demolition charges, the ship's valves had been opened and the ship settled, blocking the gates and making the drydock useless. Her crew had also smashed every piece of equipment.

Italian FR.11
She was handed over to Italy's Regia Marina, renamed FR.11 and raised on 18 February 1943. Italy received many French ships in November 1942 in addition to Jean de Vienne: 2 light cruisers, 11 destroyers, 11 minor ships (corvettes, etc.), 9 submarines and 10 minesweepers.

A ship refit was begun but was only about 85% complete at the time of the Italian armistice.

By the end of June 1943, FR.11 was ready to be moved from Toulon to Liguria for the last repairs, and a crew from the sunken Italian cruiser  was sent to Toulon in order to manage the ship. However, the departure was delayed and the vessel fell into German hands once more in September.

In an air raid, the ship was hit by incendiary bombs on 24 November 1943 and set ablaze, gradually listing until she rested against the quayside. When Toulon was liberated by the Allies in August 1944 (Operation Dragoon), a refit was considered but the idea was abandoned and Jean de Vienne was scrapped.

Bibliography

Notes

External links
 FR.11 Marina Militare website 

La Galissonnière-class cruisers
World War II cruisers of France
1935 ships
World War II warships scuttled at Toulon
Naval ships of France captured by Italy during World War II
Naval ships of France captured by Germany during World War II
Naval ships of Italy captured by Germany during World War II
Cruisers sunk by aircraft
Maritime incidents in November 1942
Maritime incidents in November 1943